Nick Sharratt (born 9 August 1962) is a British author and illustrator of children's books, whose work is split between illustrating for writers, most notably Jacqueline Wilson from 1991 to 2021, and Jeremy Strong, but also Giles Andreae, Julia Donaldson and Michael Rosen. He was chosen to be the official illustrator for World Book Day 2006, and has illustrated around 250 books, including over 50 books by Wilson, among them The Lottie Project, Little Darlings and The Story of Tracy Beaker which was the most borrowed library book in the UK for the first decade of the 21st century. The books on which Sharratt and Wilson have collaborated have sold more than 40 million copies in the UK and sales of picture books illustrated by Sharratt exceed 10 million.

Early life
Sharratt was born on 9 August 1962 in Bexleyheath, Greater London, and grew up in Suffolk, Nottinghamshire and Manchester, with his four siblings. He attended Manchester Polytechnic (now called Manchester Metropolitan University) where he completed an art foundation course. He was trained in graphic design at St. Martin's School of Art and took his later inspiration from the pop and graphic art of the 1960s, which he experienced as a child.

Work
Sharratt illustrates for children's authors as well as producing his own picture books for a younger audience.

Sharratt's books include Shark in the Park, Ketchup on your Cornflakes?, What's In the Witch's Kitchen?, Don't Put Your Finger in the Jelly, Nelly!, Octopus Socktopus and My Mum and Dad make Me Laugh. With Pippa Goodhart he created the million-selling You Choose. He illustrated Pants, written by Giles Andreae, and Chocolate Mousse for Greedy Goose, Goat Goes to Playgroup and Toddle Waddle by Julia Donaldson. Nick has also written two chapter books, The Cat and the King and Nice Work for the Cat and the King.

Shark in the Park has been turned into a touring theatrical show by Nonsense Room Productions. His animated illustrations were an integral part of the hugely successful CBBC series The Story of Tracy Beaker and Tracy Beaker Returns. Sharratt has a touring exhibition, 'Pirates, Pants and Wellyphants', which has been seen by 140,000 visitors to date.

Awards
Sharratt has won numerous awards including the Red House Children's Book Award, the Nestle Children's Book Award, The Right Start Award (book category), the Under Fives non-fiction She/WHSmith Award and the Educational Writers Award. He has won regional library book prizes in Nottingham, Norfolk, Oxfordshire, Perth, Sheffield, Stockport, Southampton, Portsmouth and Somerset, was shortlisted for the Kate Greenaway Medal in 2002 and is a fellow of Hereford College of Art. He is also a recipient of a gold Blue Peter badge. Sharratt's work has been exhibited in Britain, Italy, Japan and the US.

Bibliography

 I Went to the Zoopermarket
 Ketchup on your Cornflakes?
 Ouch, I need a Plaster!
 Don't Put Your Finger in the Jelly, Nelly!
 A Cheese and Tomato Spider
 Eat Your Peas
 Shark in the Park
 My Mum and Dad Make Me Laugh
 What's in the Witch's Kitchen?
 Pants
 More Pants
 Dear Mother Goose
 The Big Book of Crazy Mix-Ups
 Mixed-Up Fairy Tales
 You Choose
 The Green Queen
 Caveman Dave
 Mrs Pirate
 The Pointy-Hatted Princesses
 Monday Runday
 Chocolate Mousse for Greedy Goose
 Hippo has a Hat
 Toddle Waddle
 Something Beginning with Blue
 Red Rockets and Rainbow Jelly
 One to Ten and Back Again
 Faster, Faster, Nice and Slow
 Alphabet Ice Cream
 Mr Pod and Mr Piccalilli
 The Big Book of Magical Mix-Ups
 Elephant Wellyphant
 Octopus Socktopus
 Moo-Cow, Kung-fu-Cow
 One Fluffy Baa-Lamb, Ten Hairy Caterpillars
 One Mole Digging a Hole
 Never Shake a Rattlesnake
 Wriggle and Roar
 The Gooey Chewy Rumble Plop Book
 The Icky Sticky Snot and Blood Book
 Socks
 What Do I Look Like?
 Look What I've Found
 Caveman Dave (1994)
 Where Babies Come From (1997)

References

External links
 
 Gallery at Children's Book Illustration
 
 

1962 births
Living people
Alumni of Manchester Metropolitan University
Alumni of Saint Martin's School of Art
British children's book illustrators
English children's writers
English illustrators